The Tourism Corporation of Gujarat, operating under the brand of Gujarat Tourism, is a government undertaking formed in 1978 to promote tourism in the Indian state of Gujarat and guide tourists visiting Gujarat.

Hill stations

 Wilson Hills
 Saputara
 Pavagadh Hill

References

External links 

 Official Site of Gujarat, India
 Official Tourism Site of Gujarat, India

Tourism in Gujarat
State tourism development corporations of India
State agencies of Gujarat
1976 establishments in Gujarat
Government agencies established in 1976